Geoffrey Rees CBE FRSA (born 28 February 1946) was the principal of Ivybridge Community College in Devon, England until early 2010. Until 2006, he served as a governor of both Plymouth University and the University College of St Mark & St John, Plymouth.  He was a long serving member of the Devon & Cornwall LSE board.  He is also non-executive director of the Mountbatten watersports centre in Plymouth.  He has served on various committees such as The Duke of Edinburgh's Award West Country board. He has been an advisor to the Institute of Directors.  Geoffrey Rees is recognised as a 'Leader of Change' on the international education scheme.  Geoff has most recently been involved in advising the government on what form the education legacy will take on the Olympic site following the 2012 Games.

Career
Having studied at the University of Exeter and Emmanuel College, Cambridge, he started his career in 1969 as an assistant history teacher in Richmond upon Thames, and taught in schools in Sussex and Essex before moving to Devon in 1979. He held senior posts at schools in Plymouth and north Devon before taking up his appointment at Ivybridge in 1987.

Rees oversaw large-scale developments and improvements that culminated in a number of awards being presented to Ivybridge Community College. In 2005, ICC was awarded 'Science & Maths College' status, this being the college's second such award after being named a 'Sports College' some years before.  The college has gone on to achieve specialist status in Languages.  It also is a leading edge institution and a training school; all these carry additional funding streams.  The college has received 'Outstanding' in its last four Ofsted inspections, as of 2009 reports, which has led to it being granted 'High Performing' status.  Under his leadership the school has gained International School Status via the British Council.

Having become a fellow of the Royal Society of Arts in 1994, in 2003 he was honoured as Commander of the Order of the British Empire in recognition of his services to education.

He announced, on 5 February 2009, that he would be retiring as Principal of Ivybridge Community College at the end of the year, after holding the position for 22 years.

Personal life
Rees has always enjoyed sporting activity, and includes completing the London Marathon amongst his personal achievements.  Before teaching, Mr Rees was an avid rugby union player in his native Wales and went on to Captain the Cambridge University team in a successful Varsity match against Oxford University.

Rees is the middle child of Sidney and Mary Rees.  He has an older brother Brian, and a younger sister Mandy.

References

External links
 Ivybridge Community College
 NACE Policy for Able Children

Schoolteachers from Devon
Living people
Commanders of the Order of the British Empire
People associated with the University of Plymouth
English people of Welsh descent
Alumni of the University of Cambridge
1946 births
Heads of schools in England